Thunderhawks may refer to:

 Niagara Thunderhawks, a Junior "B" box lacrosse team
 Toronto ThunderHawks, an indoor soccer team

See also

 Thunderhawk (disambiguation)